Transcription factor GATA-5 is a protein that in humans is encoded by the GATA5 gene.

Function 

The protein encoded by this gene is a transcription factor that contains two GATA-type zinc fingers. The encoded protein is known to bind to hepatocyte nuclear factor-1alpha (HNF-1alpha), and this interaction is essential for cooperative activation of the intestinal lactase-phlorizin hydrolase promoter. In other organisms, similar proteins may be involved in the establishment of cardiac smooth muscle cell diversity.

Role in development 

Gata5 is a transcription factor. Gata5 regulates the proper development of the heart. Early in embryo development, Gata5 helps in making sure that there are enough heart muscle precursor cells produced to differentiate into the final myocardial cells. It also regulates other genes that are crucial to successful heart development. As pregnancy progresses, Gata 5 is involved in the specification of the heart tissue that becomes the ventricles. Problems can arise when Gata5 is overexpressed. This overexpression can lead to ectopic foci. Ectopic foci are also known as ectopic pacemakers. They are bundles of cells that can cause cardiac pacing that are located in places in the heart where they're not supposed to be. These cells can become excited before the heart is supposed to be excited. This causes the heart to beat and thus contract before it should. Oftentimes, this is not a big deal and the heart naturally reverts to its normal pacing. However, if it's caused by problems with development in the heart – if Gata5 did not express properly in the embryo- then this can lead to constant ectopic foci problems. These problems include tachycardia (the heart beating too fast), bradycardia (the heart beating too slow), or ventricular fibrillation which is a serious condition where the ventricles of the heart aren't pumping consistently and can't get blood out to the body.

See also 
 GATA transcription factor

References

Further reading

External links 
 

Transcription factors